In Greek mythology, Chloris (Greek Χλωρίς Chlōrís, from χλωρός chlōrós, meaning "greenish-yellow", "pale green", "pale", "pallid", or "fresh") was a nymph/goddess who was associated with spring, flowers and new growth, believed to have dwelt in the Elysian Fields.

Mythology 
Chloris was abducted by Zephyrus, the god of the west wind (which, as Ovid himself points out, was a parallel to the story of his brother Boreas and Orithyia), who transformed her into a deity known as Flora after they were married. Together, they have a son, named Karpos. She was also thought to have been responsible for the transformations of Adonis, Attis, Crocus, Hyacinthus and Narcissus into flowers.

Depictions

See also
 Demeter/Ceres
 Leshy
 List of nature deities
 Orithyia

Citations

General references 
 Publius Ovidius Naso, Fasti translated by James G. Frazer. Online version at the Topos Text Project.
 Publius Ovidius Naso, Fasti. Sir James George Frazer. London; Cambridge, MA. William Heinemann Ltd.; Harvard University Press. 1933. Latin text available at the Perseus Digital Library.

Nymphs